= OV Gallery =

Art gallery in Shanghai, China

OV Gallery (Chinese: OV畫廊) is an art gallery in Shanghai, China. The gallery, which opened in 2006, offers exhibits that target issues in contemporary China using history as a reference point. The gallery works with both emerging contemporary Chinese artists and foreign artists living in Shanghai as well as with more established contemporary Chinese and foreign artists. in 2010, the gallery was temporarily shut down by the Culture Bureau due to a controversial exhibit that challenged the accepted view of history.
